Alangudi is a state legislative assembly constituency in Pudukkottai district in the Indian state of Tamil Nadu. It includes the city, Alangudi and is a part of the Sivaganga Lok Sabha constituency. The constituency is in existence since the 1957 election. It is one of the 234 State Legislative Assembly Constituencies in Tamil Nadu, in India.

Madras State

Tamil Nadu

Election results

2021

2016

2011

2006

2001

1996

1991

1989

1984

1980

1977

1971

1967

1962

1957

Notes

References 
 

Assembly constituencies of Tamil Nadu
Pudukkottai district